is a railway station in Oshamambe, Hokkaidō, Japan.

Lines
Hokkaido Railway Company
Hakodate Main Line Station H49

Surrounding area
  National Route 5
  National Route 230
 Hokkaidō Expressway Kunnui IC
 Kunnui Post Office
 Hakodate Bus "Kunnui" Bus Stop

Adjacent stations

Railway stations in Japan opened in 1903
Railway stations in Hokkaido Prefecture